Amphaxitis refers to the western maritime part of the Mygdonia district of ancient Macedonia, on Axius river.

References

Hazlitt, The Classical Gazetteer > page 32

Geography of ancient Mygdonia